Piskunovia is a genus of moth in the family Gelechiidae. It contains the species Piskunovia reductionis, which is found in Japan and the Russian Far East.

References

Litini
Monotypic moth genera